Club Polideportivo Almería is a football club based in the city of Almería, Andalusia, in Spain. It currently plays in División de Honor, holding home matches at Estadio Juventud Emilio Campra, which holds a capacity of 2,000 people.

History
Polideportivo Almería started to play in 1983 in Regional Preferente, fifth tier, achieving promotion to Tercera División in its first season. Two years later, the club promoted for the first time to Segunda División B, third tier, where it would play from 1986 to 1989, when it was relegated again to Tercera. The club had serious economic problems that almost made the entity disappear. The team managed to play the season, but finished in the middle of the table.

In 1994, Polideportivo Almería promoted again to Segunda División B, where it would play during seven seasons completing the best years of the history of the club. In 1999, Poli played the promotion playoffs to Segunda División, but it finished in the third position in its group, with Levante (promoted team), Real Madrid B and Bermeo. During the 1999–2000 Copa del Rey, Polideportivo Almería faced FC Barcelona in the second round. Poli earned a 0–0 draw in the first leg, played at home, but lost 2–0 at Camp Nou with the two goals scored in the last minutes.

In 2001, due to its financial trouble, Poli Almería would withdraw from Segunda División B and ceased in activity. Two years later, the club registered again to play in the Provincial leagues but in 2007 retired its teams from competition.

In 2012, Polideportivo Almería returns again to competition controlled by a new board, that gave it a new philosophy based on a claim of popular football. The club is democratically run by its members who have equal voting rights and own one share in the club each.

In 2016, the club promoted to the fifth tier, this time called División de Honor. Two years later, Poli came back to Tercera División 24 years after their last participation.

In the 2018–19 season the club finished 13th in Tercera División, Group 9. On July 9, 2019, the club officially presented its new head coach Alvaro García Búrdalo.

Season to season

10 seasons in Segunda División B
10 seasons in Tercera División

References

External links
Official website
Profile at BDFutbol

 
Football clubs in Andalusia
Sport in Almería
Association football clubs established in 1983
Divisiones Regionales de Fútbol clubs
1983 establishments in Spain
Fan-owned football clubs